Nicholas St. John Green (March 30, 1830 – September 8, 1876) was an American philosopher and lawyer, one of the members of The Metaphysical Club. Green is known for his contributions  in the field of law as well as his involvement in the formation of pragmatism. He has been named as the “grandfather of pragmatism” by Charles Peirce.

Early life 

Nicholas St. John Green, born March 30, 1830 in Dover, New Hampshire was a son of a Unitarian minister, James D. Green. Green earned the title of Bachelor of Arts on the Harvard University in 1851. After earning his law degree in 1861 he was a paymaster during the course of the Civil War.

Career 

After the war Nicholas St. John Green published some of his articles in American Law Review, which allowed him to become a lecturer at the Harvard University in 1870. Three years later he was given a position of professor of law at the University of Boston, which he accepted. While in Boston, he was also serving as the Acting Dean at the university. Green's notable work includes the notion of multiple causes for every event, an idea which stood in opposition to the then widely accepted notion of single chain of causation.

Death 

Nicholas St. John Green died on September 8, 1876 in Cambridge, Massachusetts.

Selected works

Books 
  Details.

Journal articles

References 

1830 births
1876 deaths